The 1947 NCAA basketball tournament involved eight schools playing in single-elimination play to determine the national champion of men's NCAA Division I college basketball. It began on March 19, 1947, and ended with the championship game on March 25 in New York City. A total of 10 games were played, including a third place game in each region and a national third place game.

Holy Cross, coached by Doggie Julian, won the national title with a 58–47 victory in the final game over Oklahoma, coached by Bruce Drake. George Kaftan of Holy Cross was named the tournament's Most Outstanding Player and was on a roster that included future Los Angeles Lakers coach Joe Mullaney (basketball) and Basketball Hall of Famer Bob Cousy.

Locations
The following are the sites selected to host each round of the 1947 tournament:

Regionals

March 19 and 22
West Regional, Municipal Auditorium, Kansas City, Missouri
March 20 and 22
East Regional, Madison Square Garden, New York, New York

Championship Game

March 25
Madison Square Garden, New York, New York

Teams

Bracket

Regional third place games

See also
 1947 National Invitation Tournament
 1947 NAIA Division I men's basketball tournament

References

NCAA Division I men's basketball tournament
Tournament
NCAA basketball tournament
NCAA basketball tournament